Upper Moutere (originally called Sarau by its founding German settlers) is a locality in the Tasman District near Motueka at the top of New Zealand's South Island.

History

As early as 1839 the New Zealand Company had resolved to "take steps to procure German emigrants" and appointed a Mr Bockelman as agent of the Company in Bremen. In September 1841 the Company made an agreement in principle to sell the Chatham Islands to the Hamburg-based Deutsche Colonisation-Gesellschaft, but the British Government thwarted this move.

However, Lord Stanley, then the British Secretary of State for War and the Colonies, did agree to make the German colonists instant British subjects upon arrival in Nelson after being vetted in Hamburg first.

Most of the 140 German immigrants who arrived on the ship Sankt Pauli in 1843 and formed the nucleus of the villages of Sarau (now known as Upper Moutere) and Neudorf were Lutheran Protestants with a small number of Bavarian Catholics. 

The trip had lasted 176 days, during which time four young children had perished, seven couples had been joined in Holy Matrimony, one baby had been born and two passengers had jumped ship at a re-provisioning harbour. After a brief initial period of prosperity the inherent problems of lack of land and capital caught up with the Nelson settlements and they entered a prolonged period of relative depression. Organised immigration ceased until the 1850s and labourers had to accept a cut in their wages by one third. By the end of 1843 artisans and labourers began leaving Nelson and by 1846 a quarter of the immigrants had moved away.

Charles Kelling was in charge of the second German immigration ship to the Nelson region, the Skjold, which arrived in 1844. He moved to Sarau after first having established the village of Ranzau with his brother Fedor. Charles Kelling became a community leader in Sarau. He represented the Moutere (1862–1869) and then the Waimea West (1869–1873) electorates on the Nelson Provincial Council.

Sarau was renamed Upper Moutere as a result of the anti-German feeling aroused by the First World War.

Demographics 

Upper Moutere had a population of 1,962 at the 2018 New Zealand census, an increase of 132 people (7.2%) since the 2013 census, and an increase of 285 people (17.0%) since the 2006 census. There were 723 households. There were 1,008 males and 957 females, giving a sex ratio of 1.05 males per female. The median age was 46.5 years (compared with 37.4 years nationally), with 399 people (20.3%) aged under 15 years, 234 (11.9%) aged 15 to 29, 1,023 (52.1%) aged 30 to 64, and 306 (15.6%) aged 65 or older.

Ethnicities were 95.4% European/Pākehā, 7.3% Māori, 0.9% Pacific peoples, 1.2% Asian, and 1.7% other ethnicities (totals add to more than 100% since people could identify with multiple ethnicities).

The proportion of people born overseas was 23.2%, compared with 27.1% nationally.

Although some people objected to giving their religion, 67.4% had no religion, 20.8% were Christian, 0.6% were Hindu, 0.2% were Muslim, 0.8% were Buddhist and 2.3% had other religions.

Of those at least 15 years old, 360 (23.0%) people had a bachelor or higher degree, and 249 (15.9%) people had no formal qualifications. The median income was $25,200, compared with $31,800 nationally. The employment status of those at least 15 was that 726 (46.4%) people were employed full-time, 342 (21.9%) were part-time, and 36 (2.3%) were unemployed.

Education

The first school in Upper Moutere opened in 1857. The current school opened in 1929, with the classroom from the first school moved to the current grounds in the 1940s. This classroom may be the oldest still in use in New Zealand.

References 

Populated places in the Tasman District
Populated places around Tasman Bay / Te Tai-o-Aorere